This is a List of Asian Championships medalists in sailing.

Nacra 17

RS:X

Men

Women

See also
ASF

References

Sailing-related lists